Alexander Johansson (born November 30, 1988) is a Swedish former professional ice hockey forward. He most notably played in the Swedish Hockey League (SHL).

Playing career
Undrafted, Johansson made his Swedish Hockey League debut playing with Växjö Lakers during the 2012–13 SHL season.

After four seasons with  including claiming the Le Mat Trophy in the 2014–15 season, Johansson opted to sign a two-year contract with fellow SHL club, Färjestad BK, on April 21, 2016. In his debut season with Färjestad in 2016–17, Johansson enjoyed a career best year offensively, collecting 15 goals and 32 points in 47 games.  At the conclusion of the year, Johansson was selected with the honour of being named team captain for the following 2017–18 season.

Johansson suffered an injury-plagued 2018–19 season, restricting him to just 14 games. With limited prospects of regaining his roster spot, the remaining two years on his contract with Färjestad was ended on 7 May 2019.

On 12 June 2019, Johansson as a free agent signed his first contract abroad, agreeing to a one-year deal with German club, Grizzlys Wolfsburg of the DEL.

Career statistics

Awards and honors

References

External links

1988 births
Living people
Färjestad BK players
Grizzlys Wolfsburg players
Linköping HC players
Rögle BK players
Swedish ice hockey forwards
IF Troja/Ljungby players
People from Värnamo Municipality
Växjö Lakers players
Sportspeople from Jönköping County